Fachin, fachan or fachen is a monster or giant described by John Francis Campbell in Popular Tales of the West Highlands as having a single eye, a single hand, and a single leg. 

Fachin may also refer to:
 Fâchin, a commune in Nièvre, Bourgogne-Franche-Comté, France
 Fachin (surname)

See also
 Fachine (Chiliotrichum diffusum), a species of small shrub in the family, Asteraceae